Holmes Rolston III (born November 19, 1932) is a philosopher who is University Distinguished Professor of Philosophy at Colorado State University. He is best known for his contributions to environmental ethics and the relationship between science and religion. Among other honors, Rolston won the 2003 Templeton Prize, awarded by Prince Philip in Buckingham Palace.  He gave the Gifford Lectures, University of Edinburgh, 1997–1998. He also serves on the Advisory Council of METI (Messaging Extraterrestrial Intelligence).

The Darwinian model is used to define the main thematic concepts in Rolston's philosophy and, in greater depth, the general trend of his thinking.

Life
His grandfather and father Holmes Rolston,  and Holmes Rolston Jr (who did not use the Jr) were Presbyterian ministers. Rolston III was married on June 1, 1956 to Jane Irving Wilson, with whom he has a daughter and son.  He holds a B.S. in physics and mathematics from Presbyterian-affiliated Davidson College (1953) and a Bachelor of Divinity degree from Union Presbyterian Seminary (1956).  He was ordained to the ministry of the Presbyterian Church (USA) also in 1956. He received a Ph.D. from the University of Edinburgh in 1958; his advisor was Thomas F. Torrance.  He earned an M.A. in the philosophy of science from the University of Pittsburgh in 1968, beginning his career later that year as an assistant professor of philosophy at Colorado State University and becoming a full professor in 1976. He became a University Distinguished Professor in 1992. He gave the Gifford Lectures, University of Edinburgh, 1998-1999.  He was named Templeton Prize laureate in 2003. He has lectured by invitation on all seven continents.

Holmes Rolston 1900-1977 

Holmes Rolston (1900-1977), father of Holmes Rolston III, was the Editor-in-Chief of the Presbyterian Church Board of Christian Education, in the United States, Richmond, Virginia between 1949 and 1969, and a widely published author of curriculum materials in Christian education.

He gave the Sprunt Lectures, Union Theological Seminary, Richmond, Series XXXI 1941-1942, published as The Social Message of the Apostle Paul (John Knox Press, 1942). He also wrote a number of books on personalities in the Bible, for example: Faces about the Christ (John Knox Press, 1959) and Personalities Around David (John Knox Press, 1968). See Who's Who in America, 39th ed., 1976-1977.

Views on rights

Rolston accepts that humans have rights but has criticized the idea of animal rights and extending rights to flora because there are no rights in the wild. Rolston has argued that a rights approach to sentient life is ill-suited to ecosystems and when a moral agent is faced with suffering in an ecosystem there is no duty to intervene. In 1991, Rolston stated:

Rolston has also argued that "environmental ethics accepts predation as good in wild nature", Rolston says that wild predation should be respected because it has great importance for larger ecosystem and evolutionary processes. For example, predators eliminate weak and unfit individuals from populations of prey organisms contributing to the overall integrity of those species and culling of unfit organisms by predators is vital to the evolutionary process of natural selection, which Rolston believes trends towards more complex and diverse life forms. Rolston has stated that predation is an integral part of nature which "yields a flourishing of species" and has contributed to some of the most significant achievements in natural history and that without predation, life on earth would be greatly impoverished. 

Rolston has argued that when humans encounter wild nature they are not under any duty or obligation to alleviate any wild animal suffering and that since animals in the wild have no claim to a pleasant life free of pain then humans have no moral duty to provide them with one. Rolston says that this also holds true for domesticated animals because although they have been brought under the care of humans, their origins are from wild nature so the comparison class for assessing conduct towards them should not be from humans but from other animals. In Rolston's view domesticated animals like wild animals "have no right or welfare claim to have from humans a kinder treatment than in nonhuman nature".

Bibliography 
Holmes Rolston III is author of eight books that have won acclaim in both academic journals and the mainstream press. They are:

A New Environmental Ethics: The Next Millennium for Life on Earth  (Routledge, 2012)
Three Big Bangs: Matter-Energy, Life, Mind  (Columbia University Press, 2011)
Genes, Genesis and God (Cambridge University Press, 1999) Gifford Lectures
 Science and Religion: A Critical Survey (Random House 1987, McGraw Hill, Harcourt Brace; new edition, Templeton Foundation Press, 2006)
 Philosophy Gone Wild (Prometheus Books, 1986, 1989)
Environmental Ethics (Temple University Press, 1988)
Conserving Natural Value (Columbia University Press, 1994)
Religious Inquiry: Participation and Detachment (Philosophical Library, 1985)
John Calvin Versus the Westminster Confession (Richmond, VA: John Knox Press, 1972)
"Care on Earth: Generating Informed Concern."  Pages 205-245 in Paul Davies and Niels Henrik Gregersen, eds., Information and the Nature of Reality: From Physics to Metaphysics (Cambridge University Press, 2010)

Quotes

See also 
 American philosophy
 List of science and religion scholars
 List of American philosophers

References

Further reading
Saving Creation: Nature and Faith in the Life of Holmes Rolston, III, Christopher J. Preston (San Antonio: Trinity University Press, 2009).
Nature, Value, Duty: Life on Earth with Holmes Rolston, III, Christopher J. Preston and Wayne Ouderkirk, eds. (Berlin: Springer, 2007)
"Holmes Rolston, III" in Key Thinkers on the Environment, Joy A. Palmer Cooper and David E. Cooper, eds. (London: Routledge, 2018), pages 291-297.
"Rolston, Holmes," in Encyclopædia Britannica, 2004 Book of the Year, pages 92–93.
Encyclopædia Britannica Online, 2008. Rolston/ Holmes Rolston. 2008.
Encyclopedia of Environmental Ethics and Philosophy (Detroit: Macmillan Reference, Gale, 2009), vol. 2, pp. 211–212, "Rolston, Holmes, III," by Philip Cafaro.
 "Rolston, Holmes," in Anne Becher, ed. American Environmental Leaders: From Colonial Times to the Present (Santa Barbara, California: ABC-Clio, November 2000), vol II, L-Z, pages 691-692; Millerton, NY: Grey House Publishing, 2008, vol. II, L-Z, pp. 695–697.
 "A Philosopher Gone Wild," in David D. Karnos and Robert G. Shoemaker, eds., Falling in Love with Wisdom: American Philosophers Talk About Their Calling (New York: Oxford University Press, 1993).
"Rolston, Holmes (1932-    )" in Environmental Encyclopedia, 1st, 2nd, 3rd editions.  Marci Bortman et al., eds. (Detroit: Thomson/Gale, 2003).
"Natural Thinker," Cover story by Steve Lipsher, Denver Post Empire Magazine, June 8, 1997, cover and pages 12–15, 22.
"Rolston, III, Holmes," Encyclopedia of Religion and Nature, vol. 2, pp. 1400–1401 (London and New York: Thoemmes Continuum Publishers, 2005)
"Who's Who in America - 2019", and earlier editions.  Also 2020, 2021.
Who's Who in the World - 2019, and earlier editions.
Who's Who in Science and Engineering, current and earlier editions.
U.S. Congressional Record - Rolston congratulated    2003.

External links
Official webpage at Colorado State University
Profile at Colorado State University
Interview with Holmes Rolston on ReadTheSpirit.com
Colorado State University Digital Archives
Colorado State University Streaming Media
Rolston Library, Department of Philosophy, Colorado State University
Holmes Rolston, III - Google Scholar Citations

1932 births
Living people
20th-century American philosophers
21st-century American philosophers
Alumni of the University of Edinburgh
Critics of animal rights
American Presbyterians
Calvinist and Reformed philosophers
Environmental ethicists
Philosophers of science
Templeton Prize laureates
Union Presbyterian Seminary alumni
University of Pittsburgh alumni
Writers about religion and science
Distinguished professors of philosophy
Analytic theologians